Nakina is a small unincorporated community in Columbus County, North Carolina, United States.  It lies on North Carolina Highway 905 north of Pireway, at an elevation of 43 feet (13 m).  The ZIP Code for Nakina is 28455.

Nakina lies just north of the South Carolina–North Carolina border. It was, until the 1990s. best known for producing very high quality flue-cured tobacco.

References

Unincorporated communities in North Carolina
Unincorporated communities in Columbus County, North Carolina